The 1996 Toledo Rockets football team was an American football team that represented the University of Toledo in the Mid-American Conference (MAC) during the 1996 NCAA Division I-A football season. In their sixth season under head coach Gary Pinkel, the Rockets compiled a 7–4 record (6–2 against MAC opponents), finished in a tie for second place in the MAC, and were outscored by all opponents by a combined total of 259 to 210.

The team's statistical leaders included Ryan Huzjak with 2,058 passing yards, Kevin Kidd with 453 rushing yards, and James Spriggs with 754 receiving yards.

Schedule

Roster

References

Toledo
Toledo Rockets football seasons
Toledo Rockets football